Fagley House is a historic home located in West Pikeland Township, Chester County, Pennsylvania.  It was built in 1860, and is a three-story, five bay by two bay, random fieldstone structure.  It has a gable roof and a one-story porch supported by four Doric order columns.

It was added to the National Register of Historic Places in 1976.

References

Houses on the National Register of Historic Places in Pennsylvania
Houses completed in 1860
Houses in Chester County, Pennsylvania
National Register of Historic Places in Chester County, Pennsylvania